Dr. Shahab Paranj (Persian شهاب پارنج) (born 1983, Tehran) is an Iranian-born  composer and instrumentalist based in Los Angeles. He is considered as one of the pioneers among his generation of  composers whose composition style integrates Persian and Western composition techniques. Known as a tombak virtuoso, he has performed, recorded and collaborated with numerous world-class artists and has performed in many festivals and venues throughout the world.

Education
Paranj received his first BM in cello performance from the Tehran School of Music and a second Bachelor's degree in classical composition from San Francisco Conservatory of Music, a Master's degree from Manhattan School of Music and his Ph.D. at the University of California, Los Angeles, under the tutelage of David Garner, Richard Danielpour, Ian Krouse and David Lefkowitz.

==Career==
Acclaimed by The San Francisco Examiner as "impressive", and by John Adams as "unique", Paranj blends Persian rhythmic and melodic influences with Western texture and form. Recent commissions include works for ensembles such as the Aleron Trio, San Francisco New Music Ensemble, One Great City Duo, MSM symphony orchestra, International Low Brass Trio, Russian String Orchestra and Intersection Contemporary Music Ensemble. He has written the original score for the movie Dressage (film), the winner of 2018 feature film in the "Generation" section of the Berlin Film Festival.

Paranj is known for championing Persian classical music and culture throughout the world. His style blends Persian rhythmic and melodic influences with Western texture and form.

A cellist and master of the tombak, he has played on more than 40 albums with musicians all over the world, appearing at more than 100 well known festivals and venues, such as Lincoln Center in New York, Théâtre de la Ville in Paris, Davies Symphony Hall in San Francisco. He has collaborated with ensembles such as Shamss Ensemble and soloists such as Persian master Mohammad-Reza Shajarian. Other accomplishments include film scores for independent film companies and a collaboration with artist Taraneh Hemami and Arash Fayez.

List of works
 (2019) Lost in Lut for string orchestra, commissioned by Russian String Orchestra
 (2018) Bigáh for solo piano
 (2017) The Dialogue for percussion ensemble
 (2017) Original score for movie "DRESSAGE"
 (2017) Avaz-e Jan for solo cello
 (2016) The Autumn of Norooz, for orchestra 
 (2016) String Quartet No. 2
 (2015) Dawar-e Charkh, guitar duo, commissioned by Sopraduo
 (2015) Elegy, for solo violin commissioned by Solenn Seguillon
 (2014) The Unattained
 (2013) Molten Brass, commissioned by ILBT
 (2013) Piano trio No. 1, commissioned by Aleron Trio
 (2013) Resistance  collaboration with Taraneh Hemami
 (2012) Raghs-e Lang, for percussion ensemble
 (2010) String quartet No. 1
 (2012) Fantasy for new music ensemble]]'
 (2011) Shoor for solo viola
 (2010) Shade for solo viola

References

External links
 

Living people
1983 births
Iranian composers
Manhattan School of Music alumni